The Trinidad and Tobago national U-17 football team represents Trinidad and Tobago in tournaments and friendly matches at the under-17 level. They are coached by Shawn Cooper, and have made two FIFA U-17 World Cup appearances.

Fixtures and recent results

The following is a list of match results from the previous 12 months, as well as any future matches that have been scheduled.

2023

Current players

Coach: Shawn Cooper

Current squad
The following 20 players were called up for the upcoming 2023 CONCACAF U-17 Championship that will be held from February 11 in Guatemala.

Previous results

2013 CONCACAF U-17 Championship qualification

Group 4

Competitive record

CONCACAF U-17 championship record
 1983: Runners-up
 1985: First stage
 1987: First stage
 1988: Fourth place
 1991: Fourth place
 1992: Did not enter
 1994: First stage
 1996: First stage
 1999: Fourth place Group B
 2001: Did not enter
 2003: Did not qualify
 2005: Did not qualify
 2007: Third place Group B
 2009: Fourth place Group B (tournament interrupted)
 2011: Quarter-finals
 2013: Quarter-finals
 2015: Group stage
 2017: Did not qualify
 2019: Round of 16
 2023: Round of 16
 From 1983 until 1991, competition was U-16, not U-17
 In 2009, the tournament was interrupted due to the swine flu.

FIFA U-16/17 World Cup record

See also
 Trinidad and Tobago men's national football team
 CONCACAF Under-17 Championship
 2013 CONCACAF U-17 Championship qualifying
 2013 FIFA U-17 World Cup

References

External links
 About at www.soccerwarriors.net
 Profile at http://www.wspsoccer.com
 Forum U17 at http://www.socawarriors.net/forum/

Caribbean national under-17 association football teams
u17